Michael Carrington is a British former figure skater. He is the 1952 European bronze medalist. He trained in London at the Queen's Ice Skating Club.

Competitive highlights

References 

British male single skaters
Living people
Year of birth missing (living people)